Gransherad is a former municipality in Telemark county, Norway, located north-west of the city Notodden.

Grandsherred was created in 1859 by the merger of the parishes Hovin in Tinn and Gransherad in Hjartdal. On January 1, 1886 Hovin was separated from Gransherad to form a municipality of its own. The split left Gransherad with a population of 1,393.

On 1 January 1964 the district of Øvre Jondalen with 132 inhabitants was moved to Kongsberg in Buskerud county. The rest of Gransherad, then with 1,115 inhabitants, became a part of Notodden.

Composer Klaus Egge was born in Gransherad.

The name
The Old Norse form of the name was Grandalsherað. The first element is the genitive case of a name Grandalr, the last element is herað n 'rural district'. The name Grandalr is a compound of gran f 'spruce', and dalr m 'dale, valley'.

Until 1867 the name was written "Gransherred", in the period 1867-1888 "Grandsherred", in the period 1889-1917 (again) "Gransherred", from 1918 on "Gransherad".

Villages in Vestfold og Telemark
Notodden
Former municipalities of Norway